The Very Best Of may refer to:

 The Very Best Of (Alannah Myles album), 1998
 The Very Best Of (Eagles album), 2003
 The Very Best Of (Jethro Tull album), 2001
 The Very Best Of (Kiri Te Kanawa album), 2003
 The Very Best Of (Mark Williams album), 1999
 The Very Best Of: The Dubliners, an album, 2009
 The Very Best Of: 25 Years 1987–2012, an album by the Proclaimers, 2013

See also
 Very Best (disambiguation)
 Greatest hits album